Dardağan is a village in the Kâhta District, Adıyaman Province, Turkey. The village is populated by Kurds of the Bezikan tribe and had a population of 259 in 2021.

The hamlets of Esentepe, Mahmudiye and Tanıklı are attached to the village.

References

Villages in Kâhta District
Kurdish settlements in Adıyaman Province